South Carolina Highway 179 (SC 179) is a  primary state highway in the U.S. state of South Carolina. It travels from Little River to the North Carolina state line, near Calabash.

Route description
One of the shortest state highways in the state, SC 179 starts at U.S. Route 17 (US 17) in Little River and travels to the North Carolina state line.  The route continues on as NC 179, connecting the towns of Calabash, Sunset Beach, and Ocean Isle Beach.  The entire route is two lanes wide with brief sections with a center turn lane.

History

The first SC 179 existed from 1932 to 1950, established as a renumbering of US 178.  It ran from US 17 east, through Jamestown, to the Charleston County line near Honey Hill.  By 1938, it reached its zenith by extensions to McClellanville and across the Cooper River.  In 1950, SC 179 was completely removed, majority of the route becoming secondary roads, with some sections living on as US 17 Alt. and SC 45.

The current SC 179 was established in 1979; it complements NC 179 when North Carolina established the new route and routed the southern end into South Carolina.  The route has changed little since.

Major intersections

See also

References

External links

SC 179 at Virginia Highways' South Carolina Highways Annex

179
Transportation in Horry County, South Carolina
State highways in the United States shorter than one mile